Chicago Junction may refer to:
Chicago Junction Railway, a terminal railway in Chicago, Illinois
Chicago Junction, a previous name for Willard, Ohio
Chicago Junction or North Chicago Junction, an active railroad infrastructure location in Kansas City
Chicago Junction, the World's Columbian Exposition's Jackson Park station
Chicago Junction, a previous name for Spooner, Wisconsin
North Chicago Junction, a junction and exchange station of the Chicago North Shore and Milwaukee Railroad